LOLA may refer to:

 L-ornithine L-aspartate, a treatment for hepatic encephalopathy
 Law & Order: LA, an American police procedural-legal television drama series set in Los Angeles
 Lola (song), a song by The Kinks from 1970
 London Ontario Live Arts Festival, a music festival in London, Ontario, Canada
 Lunar Orbiter Laser Altimeter, an instrument on NASA's Lunar Reconnaissance Orbiter

See also
Lola (disambiguation)